Potassium ozonide is an oxygen rich compound of potassium. It is an ozonide, meaning it contains the ozonide anion (O3−). In polarized light, it shows pleochroism. Hybrid functional calculations have predicted the compound is an insulator with a band gap of 3.0 eV, and has magnetic behavior which departs from the Curie–Weiss law.

The compound can be created by reacting ozone with potassium hydroxide, but the yield is quite low, only 5-10%.

6KOH + 4O3 -> 4KO3 + 2KOH (H2O) + O2

The compound is metastable, and will decompose to potassium superoxide and oxygen, especially if there is any water in the atmosphere. Long-term storage in very dry atmosphere is possible below around 0 °C.

KO3 -> KO2 + 1/2 O2

This compound reacts with water to form potassium hydroxide and potassium superoxide.

References

Potassium compounds
Ozonides